Ryszard Władysław Szymczak (14 December 1944, in Pruszków – 7 December 1996, in Warsaw) was a Polish football player.

On the national level he played for Poland national team (two matches) and was a participant at the 1972 Summer Olympics, where his team won the gold medal.

References 
  Polish Olympic Committee website

1944 births
1996 deaths
Polish footballers
Polish expatriate footballers
Poland international footballers
Footballers at the 1972 Summer Olympics
Olympic gold medalists for Poland
Olympic footballers of Poland
Ekstraklasa players
US Boulogne players
People from Pruszków
Olympic medalists in football
Gwardia Warsaw players
Sportspeople from Masovian Voivodeship
Medalists at the 1972 Summer Olympics
Association football forwards
Polish expatriate sportspeople in France
Expatriate footballers in France